Love Lasts Three Years is a 2011 French-Belgian comedy film written and directed by Frédéric Beigbeder and starring Gaspard Proust. It is based on Beigbeder's novel Love Lasts Three Years.

Cast 
 Gaspard Proust as Marc Marronnier
 Louise Bourgoin as Alice
 JoeyStarr as Jean-Georges
 Jonathan Lambert as Pierre
 Frédérique Bel as Kathy
 Nicolas Bedos as Antoine
 Elisa Sednaoui as Anne
 Anny Duperey as Marc's mother
 Bernard Menez as Marc's father
 Pom Klementieff as Julia
 Thomas Jouannet as Surf teacher

References

External links 

2010s French-language films
2011 comedy films
French comedy films
Belgian comedy films
Films based on French novels
2011 directorial debut films
2011 films
EuropaCorp films
Films directed by Frédéric Beigbeder
2010s French films